Konga.com is a Nigerian e-commerce company founded in July 2012 with headquarters in Gbagada, Lagos State. It offers a third-party online marketplace, as well as first-party direct retail spanning various categories including consumer electronics, fashion, home appliances, books, children's items, computers & accessories, phones and tablets, health care and personal care products. The company also has logistics service (KXPRESS), which enables the timely shipment and delivery of packages to customers.

History
Konga was founded in July 2012 by Sim Shagaya, with 20 staff. The site initially functioned as a Lagos-only online retailer focused on merchandise in the Baby, Beauty, and Personal Care categories, but broadened its scope to all of Nigeria in December 2012 and gradually expanded merchandise categories through 2012 and 2013. This expansion may have been a response to Konga's major competitor, Rocket Internet backed Jumia, which launched around the same time,

In early 2013, Konga raised a $10 million Series A round from Investment AB Kinnevik and Naspers. In Q2 2013, Konga beta-tested 'Konga Mall,' opening up the Konga platform to third-party retailers and moving away from a pure first-party online retail model. In late 2013, Konga finalized a $25 million Series B round from previous investors, Investment AB Kinnevik and Naspers, the largest single round raised by a single African startup at the time. On November 29, 2013, Konga.com crashed and remained offline for 45 minutes as a result of unprecedented traffic stemming from its Black Friday promotion. Konga sold more during the first six hours of the promotion than it did in the prior month.

Konga officially launched its third-party retail platform in the first half of 2014, rebranding it as 'Marketplace' from 'Konga Mall'; by the end of 2014, Konga's Marketplace featured 8,000 merchants, beating internal targets of 1,000 merchants eight-fold.  Konga received US$3.5 million worth of orders during its 2014 Black Friday promotion, compared to US$300,000 during the promotion in the previous year. Konga reportedly grew 2014 revenue 450% from 2013. In late 2014, Konga finalized a $40 million Series C round from Investment AB Kinnevik and Naspers, the largest single round raised by a single African startup to date. Despite reports that Naspers acquired 50% of Konga in 2013, publicly traded Naspers disclosed that its stake in Konga after the October 2014 Series C investment was 40.22%. Konga was reportedly valued at approximately $200 million as of the Series C.

In January 2015, Konga was ranked as the most visited website in Nigeria by Alexa Internet. According to CEO Sim Shagaya, Konga "leads the field in Nigeria today [early 2015] in Gross Merchandise Value," a metric measuring the total value of merchandise sold through a particular marketplace.

Konga announced it acquired the assets and mobile money license of Zinternet Nigeria Limited in June 2015, thereby meeting the Central Bank of Nigeria's legal requirement for the provision of mobile payment services. The acquisition will support KongaPay, launched in August 2015, Konga's solution to facilitate uptake of cashless electronic payments.  With over 80 million mobile internet users in Nigeria, Konga has made online payment easy with its delivery payment option embraced by its numerous users.

Types of services

KongaPay
KongaPay was launched as a pilot product in 2015 in partnership with Nigerian commercial banks in order to work for customers only within the Konga.com's platform.

The challenge of lack of trust in making online payment was quenched by KongaPay that has made it possible for anyone to use Konga's online platform. This innovation had protected online shoppers against the reports of fraud when they release their bank details online. KongaPay is similar to what is seen in Amazon platform with its one-click payments. It was unveiled in Lagos, Nigeria at a KongaPay Demo event. The payment option has been fully integrated with Ecobank, Access bank, FCMB, Diamond Bank, Zenith Bank, Heritage Bank, UBA, First Bank and GTB.

According to Sim Shagaya, KongaPay is a partnership with Nigeria's banks. We strongly believe that together, we could change the face of online shopping in Nigeria by removing the uncertainties customers associate with pre-paying for goods and services they are yet to receive.”

KongaPay has become the game-changer in the online shopping in Nigeria. This is because it has made possible for a seamless movement of goods, services and payments.  This has grown safety and trust among Konga's users.

With KongaPay, a customer receives an authorization code that is secured and registered to the mobile phone number on the website. There is no need for customers to sign up for electronic banking if the customer has a registered mobile phone number and a bank account. KongaPay has eliminated the use of sensitive personal information such as Internet banking passwords or card details with just a click.

Konga Express

To make its online integration very effective, Konga introduced Konga Express that focus on selling of its products to reach the buyer with every available means. Customers can have their ordered products get to them within 1–3 days. Konga Express fulfills the orders that are made daily with online tracking.

Konga Marketplace
Konga started its massive expansion in Nigeria with Konga Mall, which is a revolutionary option that allows businesses in Nigeria to showcase their products online. Business owners were offered a free and simple delivery service. The business owner packages order that is accompanied with SellerHQ details and details of the order before dropping the parcel at Konga's dropoff center.

With the success of Konga Mall, came Konga Marketplace that has made it possible for even roadside sellers to be involved from any part of the country. Amazing products have been discovered and massive sales are made daily through this market. The sellers and buyers interact in this marketplace which is revolutionary. Unlimited opportunities have been created through this marketplace that has ended up boosting employment and economic growth and development in the country. Affiliate marketing and comparison online stores such as bestprices has also become possible with this marketplace.

Sim Shagaya says;“About a year ago, we realised that for our services to be really valuable to society, we had to build a platform for anyone, not just Konga, to sell and prosper. We launched this platform to a limited number of sellers and in that time, we have learned how to build a truly revolutionary Nigerian online marketplace…”

Konga Self-Fulfill Model
Self-Fulfill Model was a major upgrade in Konga's marketplace offer. This service made it possible for its merchants to have great shipping agreements negotiated by Konga with reputable courier partners. The sellers control the management of its parcels from the point of order till the customers receive them. Payments are made directly to the sellers from the buyers when they receive their parcels. Buyers expect flexible and faster delivery of their parcels through Self-Fulfill Model. Self-Fulfill Model has the option of allowing customers rate sellers, products and overall experience.

Zinox acquisition
Two months after laying off over half of its staff, Konga was acquired by Zinox, a Nigerian firm that manufactures and distributes computers. Following the acquisition, a few changes were made to the Konga leadership. In March 2018, the company appointed Olusiji Ijogun, former UAC Foods and Unilever executive as its chairman. Later that month, Shola Adekoya, resigned from his role as Konga CEO to be replaced by Nick Imudia, the immediate past Regional Director TCL/Alcatel and Prince Nnamdi Ekeh the Founder of Yudala.

On 1 May 2018, Zinox merged Konga.com with its emerging retail outfit, Yudala, into a newer, bigger company, maintaining the Konga brand name, to become arguably the biggest e-commerce & retail company in Africa. The new Konga combined the online e-commerce strength of Konga.com and the expansive branch network of Yudala to execute pure omni-channel retail for the first time in Africa. Rumours suggest that Zinox acquired Konga for a meagre $10 million suggesting that Kinnevik and Naspers, its long term investors lost a combined 93% return on investment.

Competition
Konga faces competition from other dominant African digital commerce platforms, such as Jumia, Kilimall and even recently founded ecommerce platforms, Cashless CF, Buzymart, Tradift, DayDone due to the been niched product, location and a strong agency networks these platforms have.

Domain war with Jumia
In 2014, Jumia registered some Konga domains outside Nigeria which caused huge uproar in the technology scene. Konga had been talking up the possibility of expanding outside Nigeria which Jumia was already doing with Jumia having operations in more than 8 countries across Africa.

Awards
 #1 - The Top 100 Companies For Nigerian Millennials (2015) 
E-Commerce Provider of the Year, Kalahari Awards (2015) 
 #1 - Top Startups in Nigeria (2015) 
 #2 - Most Innovative Companies of 2015 in Africa - Fast Company (2015)
 #12 - Most Respected Companies in Nigeria (2014)
Online Retailer of the Year - Marketing World Awards (2014)
Best Use of Social Media in Marketing - Marketing World Awards (2014)
Most Innovative and Impactful Brand in the Retail Trade Sector - The Lagos Chamber of Commerce and Industry (2014)
 #5 - Most Innovative Companies of 2014 in Africa - Fast Company (2014)
Online Retailer of the Year - Marketing World Awards (2013)
Best Emerging Brand Of The Year - Marketing World Awards (2013)

References

External links

2012 establishments in Nigeria
Nigerian brands
Online marketplaces of Nigeria
Book selling websites
Retail companies established in 2012
Internet properties established in 2012
Economy of Lagos State
Companies based in Lagos